Orania decipiens is a species of flowering plant in the family Arecaceae. It is found only in the Philippines.

References

decipiens
Flora of the Philippines
Near threatened plants
Taxa named by Odoardo Beccari
Taxonomy articles created by Polbot